FC Las Tunas  is a Cuban football team playing in the Cuban National Football League and representing Las Tunas Province. They play their home games at the Ovidio Torres in Manatí.

Current squad
2018 Season

References

Football clubs in Cuba
Fc Las Tunas